HMS Diana was a D-class destroyer of the Royal Navy. Ordered in 1931, the ship was constructed by Palmers Shipbuilding and Iron Company, and entered naval service in 1932. Diana was initially assigned to the Mediterranean Fleet before she was transferred to the China Station in early 1935. She was temporarily deployed in the Red Sea during late 1935 during the Abyssinia Crisis, before returning to her duty station where she remained until mid-1939. Diana was transferred back to the Mediterranean Fleet just before the Second World War began in September 1939. She served with the Home Fleet during the Norwegian Campaign. The ship was transferred to the Royal Canadian Navy in 1940 and renamed HMCS Margaree. She served for just over a month with the Canadians before being sunk in a collision with a large freighter she was escorting on 22 October 1940.

Design and construction
Steam for the turbines was provided by three Admiralty 3-drum water-tube boilers. The ship's complement was 145 officers and men.

The ship mounted four 45-calibre 4.7-inch Mark IX guns in single mounts. For anti-aircraft (AA) defence, Diana had a single 12-pounder AA gun between her funnels and two QF 2-pounder Mk II AA guns mounted on the side of her bridge. She was fitted with two above-water quadruple torpedo tube mounts for 21-inch torpedoes. One depth charge rail and two throwers were fitted; 20 depth charges were originally carried, but this increased to 35 shortly after the war began.

Diana was ordered under the 1930 Naval Estimates on 2 February 1931 from the yards of Palmers Shipbuilding and Iron Company, Hebburn-on-Tyne. She was laid down on 12 June 1931, launched on 16 June 1932 and finally commissioned into the Navy on 21 December 1932. She cost a total of £229,502, excluding the weapons and the communications equipment which were supplied by the Admiralty.

Operational history

With the Royal Navy
The ship was initially assigned to the 1st Destroyer Flotilla in the Mediterranean and made a brief deployment to the Persian Gulf and Red Sea in September–November 1933. While in the Mediterranean, Diana was commanded by Geoffrey Oliver for a time. The ship was refitted at Sheerness Dockyard between 3 September and 23 October 1934 for service on the China Station with the 8th (later the 21st) Destroyer Flotilla and arrived there in January 1935. She was attached to the Mediterranean Fleet in the Red Sea from September 1935 to May 1936 during the Abyssinian Crisis and made port visits in Bombay and East Africa before returning to Hong Kong on 7 August. On one occasion in 1937 Diana investigated why a lighthouse near Amoy was not lit and discovered that it had been attacked by pirates. She remained in the Far East until the rise in tensions before World War II began prompted her recall in August 1939.

She was repaired at Malta during November and rejoining the fleet in December where she was briefly placed on contraband control duties before she was transferred to the Home Fleet's 3rd Destroyer Flotilla. Diana arrived in Home waters in January 1940, and was assigned to the 3rd Destroyer Flotilla. Here her duties included screening units of the Home Fleet and carrying out patrols. On 15 February, the ship escorted HMS Duncan as she towed by tugs from Invergordon to the Forth for permanent repairs, after the latter had been damaged in a collision whilst escorting a convoy.

During the Norwegian Campaign, Diana escorted the aircraft carrier  as she returned to Scapa Flow on 25 April to replenish her aircraft. The ship escorted the carriers  and Furious as the latter flew off RAF Gloster Gladiators fighters to Bardufoss airfield on 21 May. Ten days later Diana escorted the carriers  and Furious during Operation Alphabet, the Allied withdrawal from Norway.

Transfer to Canada
The ship was taken in hand for refit and repair in London in July. After their completion, Diana was transferred to the Royal Canadian Navy to replace  which had been sunk in a collision on 25 June 1940 with the British anti-aircraft cruiser . The ship was formally commissioned into the Royal Canadian Navy as HMCS Margaree on 6 September 1940. On 17 October, she escorted Convoy OL8 bound for Canada, but the ship was sunk five days later when she was cut in two by the freighter  just after midnight on 22 October. Of the 176 men aboard Margaree at the time, six officers and 28 ratings in the stern section, which remained afloat, were rescued by Port Fairy; the other 142 were lost.

Notes

References

External links
HMS Diana at Uboat.net
HMS Diana's career

 

Ships of the Royal Canadian Navy
C and D-class destroyers
Ships built on the River Tyne
1932 ships
World War II destroyers of the United Kingdom
Canadian River-class destroyers
Canadian River-class destroyers converted from C and D-class destroyers
Ships sunk in collisions
World War II shipwrecks in the Atlantic Ocean
Maritime incidents in October 1940